Olga Igorevna Kabo (born January 28, 1968) is a Soviet and Russian film and theater actress.

Biography
Was born in Moscow, the daughter of engineers Igor Yakovlevich and Ada Nikolayevna. From an early age she studied ballroom dance, rhythmic gymnastics, and attended art and musical courses, the latter at the Moscow Conservatory. Aged 15, she appeared in two films, the youth drama And Everything Returns (by Yaroslav Lupyi) and Vitaly Makarov's musical film No Joking. Having graduated from secondary school, Olga joined the Treatre studio at the Boris Shchukin Theatre Institute. She continued her education at the Gerasimov Institute of Cinematography where she joined the class of Sergey Bondarchuk.

Kabo's first success in film came with the part of Isabella in Sergey Tarasov's The Adventures of Quentin Durward (1988). She became famous in 1989 for her role in Lysistrata Comedy (featuring some nudity scenes) which brought her the reputation of a Russian movie sex symbol. In the 1990s she became internationally known for her roles in The Ice Runner (Lena, 1992) and Bram Stoker's Burial of the Rats (Anna, 1995). In 2002 Kabo joined the Mossovet Theatre troupe; that year she was honoured with the Meritorious Artist of Russia title.

Private life
First husband was the businessman Eduard Vasilishin. Their daughter Tatyana was born in 1998. After the divorce, she married the businessman Nikolai Razgulyayev in 2009. They have a son, Viktor, born in 2012.

Selected filmography 
Total over 68 movies.
 1983 Anna Pavlova (Анна Павлова) as maid
 1988 The Adventures of Quentin Durward, Marksman of the Royal Guard (Приключения Квентина Дорварда, стрелка королевской гвардии)
 1988 Where is the Nophelet? (Где находится нофелет?) as visitor from the Urals
 1989 Two arrows. Stone Age Detective (Две стрелы. Детектив каменного века) as Turtle
 1992 Musketeers Twenty Years After as de Longville
 1993 The Ice Runner as Lena Popovskaya
1995 Burial of the Rats as Anna
 2011 Battle of Warsaw 1920 as Sofiya Nikolayevna
 2012 The Ballad of Uhlans as Martha
 2019 Coma - Esprits prisonniers

References

External links 
 

1968 births
Living people
Actresses from Moscow
Soviet film actresses
Russian film actresses
Soviet television actresses
Russian television actresses
Soviet stage actresses
Russian stage actresses
20th-century Russian actresses
21st-century Russian actresses
Honored Artists of the Russian Federation
Gerasimov Institute of Cinematography alumni